Lotte Chemical Corporation is a chemical company headquartered in Seoul, South Korea. Lotte Chemical is one of the largest chemical companies in the world by revenue. Lotte Chemical manufactures synthetic resins and other chemical products used for various industrial materials.

History
Lotte Chemical was established as Honam Petrochemical in 1976 and became part of Lotte Group after three years. After being integrated into Lotte, the company acquired various companies for business expansion. In 2010, Honam took over Malaysia's Titan Chemicals for US$1.27 billion to expand its business to the Southeast Asian market. In 2012, Honam merged with KP Chemical and was renamed Lotte Chemical. Lotte Chemical acquired Samsung's chemical businesses, including Samsung SDI's chemical unit, Samsung Fine Chemicals, and Samsung BP Chemicals for 3 trillion won in 2016.

Products
Lotte Chemical produces ethylene, polyethylene, and polypropylene by using naphtha extracted from crude oil.

See also
 List of largest chemical producers

References

External links
 

Lotte Corporation subsidiaries
South Korean companies established in 1976
Companies listed on the Korea Exchange